Church Statute of Prince Volodimir (modern writing: Vladimir) is a source of church law in Old Rus', defined legal authority of church and legal status of clergy by the state: prince (knyaz) and his administration. Vladimir's Statute was a short legal code, regulated relationship between the church and the state, including demarcation of jurisdiction between church and princely courts, and defined index of persons and organizations within the church jurisdiction. The church also got under its supervision the system of weights and measures, and monthly support: tithe from all princely income. The statute was written at the beginning of the 12th century and remade during many centuries. The statute was written in Old Church Slavonic and Old Russian. It was one of the first church sources of Old Russian Law. Church Statute of Prince Yaroslav and other Old Russian princely statutes served to closely purposes. One of the sources of the statute was Byzantine law, including Nomocanon.

The statute opens with the words: "Behold, I, Prince Vasilii, called Volodimir," "son of Sviatoslav <...> having consulted with my Princess Anna and with my children".

History and meaning

Evgeniy (Bolkhovitinov), Konstantin Nevolin, Makariy (Bulgakov), Vasily Klyuchevsky, Vladimir Beneshevich, Aleksandr Lototskiy, George Vernadsky and Mikhail Tikhomirov considered that the statute went back to Pre-Mongol Period (before the first half of the 13th century). Serafim Yushkov, Aleksandr Zimin and Yaroslav Schapov referred the archetype of the statute to the beginning or to the first half of the 12th century. Nikolay Karamzin, Yevgeny Golubinsky attributed the basis of the statute to the 13th century. Altksey Pavlov – to the 14th century. Serafim Yushkov considered that the basis was a short "confirmative" charter (gramota) by prince Vladimir Svyatoslavich (the end of the 10th – the beginning of the 11th centuries), authorized use of church law and defined size of jurisdiction of Russian church. Yushkov reconstructed this charter: a part of the lawsuits were passed from prince, boyars and their judges to the church and the bishops. According to Yushkov the protograph of the first and second redactions was formed at the beginning of the 12th century, also reconstructed by the scholar.

Statute of Vladimir has a wide distribution in Old Russia and was known outside. Development of the statute redactions reflexes evolution of Old Russian church law and relationship between church and prince during centuries.

Copies

The original isn't survived. The statute is survived in more than 200 copies from 13th to 19th centuries united in seven redactions. These copies are a part of various Old Russian collections of laws, including Kormchiye. The oldest surviving copy of the statute is contained in Synodic Kormchaia of 1282 (Novgorod).

Collection of Church Statutes and Charters

Some copies of the statute are often a part of the Collection of Church Statutes and Charters, including church statutes of Prince Vladimir and Prince Yaroslav, the Rule on Church People and the Rule of 165 Saint Fathers. The Collection concludes with Confirmative Charter of 1402 by Vasily Dmitrievich, Grand Prince of Moscow, and Cyprian, Metropolitan of Moscow, mentioning about Vladimir's Statute (the Charter confirmed rights and privileges, given to church by princes Vladimir and Yaroslav, and  metropolitans). Thus the Statute of Vladimir could be applied up to the 15th century in Grand Duchy of Moscow and it could be later.

See also

 Old Russian Law
 Church Statute of Prince Yaroslav
 Kormchaia
 Merilo Pravednoye
 Rus'–Byzantine Treaties
 Russkaya Pravda
 Sudebnik
 Sudebnik of 1550
 Stoglav
 Sobornoye Ulozheniye

Notes

Some editions
 English translation by Daniel H. Kaiser: Synod Copy of Church Statute of Prince Vladimir. Source: The Laws of Rus' - Tenth to Fifteenth Centuries, tr., ed. by Daniel H. Kaiser (Salt Lake City: Charles Schlacks Publisher, 1992), 42-44.
 Memorials of Russian Law / ed. by Serafim Yushkov. Issue 1: Memorials of Law of Kievan State of the 10th-12th centuries / Aleksandr Zimin. - Moscow: Gosyurizdat (State Juridical Publisher), 1952. - 287 p..
 Old Russian Princely Statutes of the 11-15th centuries / Yaroslav Schapov. - Moscow: Nauka, 1976. - 239 p..
 Church Statute of Saint Vladimir (Extensive Redaction) // Mrochek-Drozdovskiy, Pyotr. The History of Russian Law. Appendix 1. - Moscow, 1892..
 Some copies of Church Statute of Prince Vladimir. Source: Makariy (Bulgakov), metropolitan of Moscow and Kolomna. The History of Russian Church. - Moscow, 1995. - Vol. 2. ).

Some literature

 Karamzin, Nikolay. The History of Russian State. - Moscow: Nauka, 1989. - Vol. 1..
 Golubinsky, Yevgeny. The History of Russian Church / 2nd edition. - Moscow, 1901. - Vol. 1, part 1..
 Suvorov, Nikolay. Traces of West Catholic Church Law in Memorials of Old Russian Law. - Yaroslavl, 1888..
 Pavlov, Altksey.  Imaginary Traces of Historical Influence in Most Ancient Memorials of South Slavic and Russian Church Law. - Moscow, 1892..
 Suvorov, Nikolay. On the West Influence on Old Russian Law. Yaroslavl, 1893..
 .
 Yushkov, Serafim. Course of the History of State and Law of USSR. - Moscow: Yurizdat (Juridical Publisher), 1949. - Vol. 1: Social and Political System and Law of Kievan State. - 542 p..
 Tsypin, Vladislav, protoiereus. Church Law. - Moscow, 1996..

Christian terminology
East Slavic manuscripts
13th-century Christianity
Kievan Rus'
Medieval legal codes
Legal history of Russia
Legal history of Belarus
Cyrillic manuscripts
13th-century manuscripts
Old East Slavic
Vladimir the Great